Mary Evans (born 1963) is a contemporary artist who lives and works in England and utilises in her subject matter both her African heritage and European upbringing.

Early life and education
Evans was born in Lagos, Nigeria in 1963. After a foundation course at St Helens College of Art & Design (1981–82), she studied painting for her B.A. at Gloucestershire College of Arts and Technology (1982–85), and attained her M.A. in Fine Art at Goldsmiths' College (1987–89). She subsequently did a postgraduate residency at the Rijksakademie, Amsterdam (1991–93).

Career
Evans has received a number of significant commissions, awards and residencies, including a Smithsonian Artists Research Fellowship, National Museum of African Art, Washington, DC, in 2010. She typically uses paper as her medium, producing large-scale, site-specific work — sometimes with reference to highly charged subjects, such as lynching in the Deep South. Her work has been exhibited extensively across the UK, as well as internationally — in the United States, the Netherlands, Mexico and China, including Farewell to Post-Colonialism at the 3rd Guangzhou Triennale in 2008, Port City (2007) at the Arnolfini, Bristol, and A Fiction of Authenticity: Contemporary Africa Abroad (2003), Contemporary Art Museum St. Louis.

Reviewing her solo exhibition Cut and Paste (2012, Tiwani Contemporary, London), critic Stephanie Baptist wrote: "Her mixed media artworks reveal not just her story, but African ancestral stories that are not often told. I will liken Evans to a griot. This role is an important one, as she is both historian and storyteller. She carries the collective narratives of the village, the tragic and the triumphant. She who remembers can reinterpret the unwritten histories and share the untold stories of the un-namable that may have otherwise been forgotten."

In 2020 Evans was included in the show Paper Routes: Women to Watch 2020 at the National Museum of Women in the Arts.

Evans is an Associate Lecturer at Central Saint Martins College of Art and Design in London.

Selected exhibitions
 1993: Mary Evans - Art & Project, Rotterdam
 1997: Filter, Leighton House, London
 2000: Because a Fire Was in my Head, South London Gallery, London
 2000: Continental Shift, Ludwig Forum fur Internationale Kunst, Aachen, Germany
 2001: Scope, Café Gallery Projects
 2003: A Fiction of Authenticity: Contemporary Africa Abroad, Contemporary Art Museum St. Louis
 2005: 5 Continents and 1 City, Museum of Mexico City, Mexico City, Mexico
 2007: Freedom & Culture, South Bank Centre, London
 2007: Port City, Arnolfini, Bristol
 2008: Meditations, Baltimore Museum of Art, Baltimore 
 2012: Cut and Paste, Tiwani Contemporary, London
 2016: Thousands Are Sailing, EVA International Biennial

Publications

 Filter, London: InIVA and the Royal Borough of Kensington and Chelsea, 1997.

References

Further reading
 Olu Oguibe, "Studio Call: Mary Evans", Nka: Journal of Contemporary African Art, Number 10, Spring/Summer 1999, pp. 38–39.

External links
 Mary Evans at Iniva
 Mary Evans on ArtFacts.Net
 Mary Evans artist's website
 Biography - Mary Evans at Religion & Place.

English artists
Nigerian contemporary artists
British contemporary artists
Black British artists
1963 births
Artists from Lagos
Living people
21st-century British women artists